The men's skeet event at the 2019 European Games in Minsk, Belarus took place from 26 to 27 June at the Sporting Club.

Schedule
All times are FET (UTC+03:00)

Records

Results

Qualification
The qualification round took place on 26 and 27 June to determine the qualifiers for the finals.

Final
The final round took place on 27 June to determine the final classification.

References

Men's skeet